Justin Berry (born July 24, 1986) operated pornographic websites, beginning at age 13, featuring himself and other teen males. In 2005, at the age of 18, he cooperated in a New York Times feature article. Before publication, Berry was granted immunity from prosecution in exchange for his help in prosecuting other men involved with his websites. After the story broke, Berry was called to testify before a Congressional committee. Berry made multiple media appearances between 2005 and 2007.

Early life and education
Justin Berry is the son of Knute Marvin Berry and Karen Page. Berry grew up in Bakersfield, California. He attended the Art Institute of Dallas in Dallas, Texas. He lived in Mexico with his Spanish-speaking father, who ran a massage parlor in Mazatlán, for a time.

Eichenwald and The New York Times
In June 2005, The New York Times reporter Kurt Eichenwald discovered Berry via a post made by Berry to a Yahoo! message board for his fans. Eichenwald contacted Berry anonymously online, telling Berry he was a songwriter and asking to meet with him. Despite concerns that the anonymous contact might be a law enforcement officer, Berry accepted a payment of $2,000 from Eichenwald on June 8, 2005, before agreeing to the meeting.

At the meeting, Eichenwald identified himself as a reporter and explained the true nature of his interest in Berry. Although Berry continued in the Internet pornography business after their initial meeting, in subsequent meetings, Eichenwald was able to gain Berry's confidence and an entry into his world.

Eichenwald requested demonstrations of the workings of Berry's online business which Berry provided, including live conversations with subscribers. After Berry revealed the identities of children who were being exploited by adults, Eichenwald persuaded him to discontinue the business and turn his information about those minors over to the authorities.

Eichenwald completed his research and writing, and, on December 19, 2005, The New York Times published "Through His Webcam, A Boy Joins A Sordid Online World", a feature-length story focusing on Berry's experiences as a "target" for "online pedophiles".

Interviews and Congressional testimony
Berry appeared with Eichenwald on the February 15, 2006, episode of The Oprah Winfrey Show to discuss his story.

On April 4, 2006, Justin Berry appeared before the Subcommittee on Oversight and Investigations of the United States House Committee on Energy and Commerce to give testimony on "Sexual Exploitation of Children Over the Internet: What Parents, Kids and Congress Need to Know About Child Predators." In this testimony he stated that "My experience is not as isolated as you might hope.." and went on to detail his ordeal. He expressed frustration that more was not being done to bring the perpetrators to justice, specifically those who molested him. Members of the committee said his testimony had fueled a new effort to toughen up the laws against the producers and purchasers of child pornography.  They also praised his courage in stepping forward, with one Congressman going so far as to suggest that any new legislation that emerged from this new effort to combat child pornography be named "the Justin Berry Act."

Kenneth Gourlay
Berry testified that in 2001, when he was 15, a man from Michigan, Ken Gourlay, then 23, asked him to work for his company, Chain Communications, and encouraged him to attend Camp CAEN, a computer camp held in the summer of 2002 at the University of Michigan in Ann Arbor. In his testimony, Berry said that Gourlay had molested Berry while he was still two months short of his 16th birthday (the age of consent) while he was in Michigan attending this camp. The molestation changed him, Berry testified: "With the help of my family and my psychologist, I now understand that my molestation by Ken was a turning point that sent me on a path to self-destruction. Afterwards, Ken apologized, promising me it would never happen again. But it did." Berry and Gourlay continued their acquaintance even after Berry moved to Mexico, with Gourlay visiting him there at least once. Their acquaintanceship is confirmed by Gourlay's blog entries regarding an online conversation and a planned meeting with Berry.

Media appearances
Berry, Eichenwald and Gourlay appeared on C-SPAN, giving testimony before the Oversight and Investigations Subcommittee of the United States House Committee on Energy and Commerce. Berry and Eichenwald were interviewed on Larry King Live by host Larry King on April 4, 2006. They were also interviewed by Katie Couric for NBC's morning talk show, Today. In 2006, Berry also appeared on other television shows such as The Oprah Winfrey Show with Kurt Eichenwald and CTV CanadaAM.

On May 9, 2006, the NBC television series Law & Order: Special Victims Unit aired an episode called "Web" that bears similarities to Berry's story.

On October 25, 2006, Berry, and Eichenwald appeared on a blog interview called The Darkness to Light Show: Breaking the Conspiracy of Silence.

In August 2007, Berry appeared on the Australian version of 60 Minutes. He was interviewed about sexual predators as part of a larger segment on the subject.

He was on the May 23, 2012, episode of the Dr. Phil Show called "Behind the Lens: Child Pornography".

Disappearance
Justin Berry disappeared in Mexico on August 21, 2018 when he was 32 years old. He is thought to be deceased.

References

External links
This article uses content licensed under the GFDL from deleted revisions of Wikipedia's article on Justin Berry. A list of previous authors of the page can be found at Talk:Justin Berry/Authors.

1986 births
Living people
American Internet celebrities
American sex workers
Child sexual abuse in the United States
People from Bakersfield, California
Webcam models